Dinesh C. Paliwal (born December 17, 1957) is an Indian American business executive. He is a Partner at Kohlberg Kravis Roberts (KKR) and also serves as Executive Chairman of Marelli. He was the Chairman and chief executive officer (CEO) of Harman International, a provider of audio and infotainment systems for the automotive, consumer, and professional markets, from 2007 to 2020.

Paliwal currently serves as a member of the boards of Nestlé, the Fortune Global 100 food and beverage company, and the board of Raytheon Technologies (NYSE:RTX). He also serves on the board of trustees of Miami University of Ohio.

He has served on the boards of Harman International, ABB, ADT, Bristol Myers, TYCO International, and Embarq Corporation. He was also a member of the CEO Business Roundtable 2003-2020. He had previously served as Chairman of the National Foreign Trade Council, ABB India Ltd., Lummus Global (an oil and gas technology company) and as a Director for the US China Business Council, US India Business Council and International Swimming Hall of Fame. He also served for three years as Economic Advisor to the Governor of Guangdong Province, China.

Education and career 
Paliwal, a US citizen born, raised and educated in India, has lived and worked in Australia, China, India, Singapore, Switzerland, and the United States. He earned an MS degree in Engineering from the Indian Institute of Technology (Roorkee, India); MS in Applied Science and Engineering and MBA in Finance from Miami University (Oxford, Ohio). In 2019, the board of trustees of Miami University also conferred an honorary Doctor of Laws degree to Dinesh for his ongoing efforts and contributions toward advancing the University's leadership in business, technology, innovation and entrepreneurial endeavors. Before joining Harman he worked at the ABB Group as President Global Markets and Technology. During his 22 years with ABB, he held management positions in five countries and was instrumental in the company's turnaround during the period 2002–2007.

In 2010, Paliwal was named Metro New York Entrepreneur of the Year by Ernst and Young, and received the Indian American Achiever Award by the Global Organization of People of Indian Origin (GOPIO). He received the Pinnacle Award as one of the Outstanding 50 Asian Americans in Business 2012 by Asian American Business Development Center. In 2014, Fortune Magazine named Paliwal in their "Businessperson of the Year" list. He was honored by the T. J. Martell Foundation in 2015 and also by Breakthrough, a global nonprofit, for his contributions in advancing women's causes in 2016. In 2017, Paliwal was named to the inaugural Recode 100, recognizing the year's most influential people in tech, business and media, and B'nai B'rith International honored him with its Distinguished Achievement Award. In the same year, Paliwal also received the Ellis Island Medal of Honor and made a donation to Miami University's Farmer School of Business along with his wife to create the Dinesh and Ila Paliwal Innovation Chair and the Dinesh and Ila Paliwal Scholarship.

Samsung announced its intent to acquire HARMAN for approximately $8 billion in November 2016, with Paliwal continuing to lead the company post-acquisition. The transaction was completed in March 2017.

Paliwal stepped down on April 1, 2020 after nearly 14 years with the company as President and CEO of Harman and served as a Senior Advisor to the board of directors and to the new CEO, Michael Mauser, until December 2020. The last ten years Paliwal tripled Harman's revenue.

Early life 

Paliwal was born on December 17, 1957 in Agra, India as one of seven children in a family of modest means. He married Ila Sharma after attending University of Roorkee. Paliwal's father, Ram Chandra Paliwal, was a nationally renowned social leader who worked closely with Mahatma Gandhi and other leaders in India's freedom movement. He obtained an engineering degree with merit from the University of Roorkee (now renamed as the Indian Institute of Technology, Roorkee), India. He was later awarded a full scholarship to pursue advanced degrees in Engineering and Management at Miami University, Oxford, Ohio, USA.

Paliwal left India in 1981, but still visits frequently with his family and for business activities. His wife, son and daughter are all accomplished musicians.

References

External links 
 Harman profile

1957 births
Living people
Indian emigrants to the United States
Miami University alumni
IIT Roorkee alumni
People from Agra
American chief executives
People from Stamford, Connecticut
Harman International
20th-century American businesspeople
21st-century American businesspeople
American people of Indian descent
Chief executives in the technology industry
American technology chief executives